Diamond Ring is a 1998 Nollywood thriller film directed by Tade Ogidan. It stars Richard Mofe Damijo, Teju Babyface, Sola Sobowale and Bukky Ajayi. It was made in 2 parts.

Plot 
Diamond Ring follows the story of conflict between the spirit of Mrs. Gladys and members of Chidi’s cult group, XG. In a bid to display his fitness for a life in the secret cult, Chidi, a freshman in the university and the only child of his parents; Chief and Mrs. Ijeoma Dike steals a diamond ring from Mrs. Gladys’ corpse. The spirit of Mrs. Gladys in turn haunts Chidi and his friends. The members of the cult begin to die successively. Chidi is struck by a peculiar sickness which could not be treated by orthodox medicine. The journey to find his healing culminates in the return of the diamond ring to Mrs. Gladys’ corpse.

Cast 

 Gbadewonuola Oyelakin as Chidi
Liz Benson as Gladys 
Bukky Ajayi as Chidi's aunt 
Richard Mofe-Damijo as Chief Dike 
Sola Sobowale as Mrs. Ijeoma Dike
 Bimbo Akintola  as Bimbo
 Tunji Bamishigbin
 Susan Cave
 Roland Henshaw
 David Kennedy

Production and release 
Diamond Ring was described as one of the few well crafted and produced Nollywood movies of the time.

References

External links 

1998 films
1998 thriller films
Nigerian thriller films